Llwynypia Hospital was a health facility in Llwynypia, Rhondda Cynon Taf, Wales. It was managed by the Cwm Taf Morgannwg University Health Board.

History
The facility has its origins an old subsidiary workhouse which was completed in 1903. An infirmary was added in 1909 and it became a general hospital in 1927 before joining the National Health Service as Llwynypia Hospital in 1948. As the only village with maternity facilities in the Rhondda, most residents from the area over the last century have Llwynypia as their place of birth on their birth certificates. After services transferred to the new Ysbyty Cwm Rhondda, Llwynypia Hospital closed in January 2010.

References

Hospitals in Rhondda Cynon Taf
Hospitals established in 1903
1903 establishments in Wales
Hospital buildings completed in 1903
Buildings and structures in Rhondda Cynon Taf
Defunct hospitals in Wales